The phrase this is why we can't have nice things may refer to:

Music
 This Is Why We Can't Have Nice Things, an album by Leland Stanford Junior University Marching Band, 2003
 This is Why We Can’t Have Nice Things, an album by Alter Der Ruine, 2010
 "I Don't Care (This Is Why We Can't Have Nice Things)", a song by The Blackout from the album The Best in Town
 "This Is Why We Can't Have Nice Things", a song by Taylor Swift from the album Reputation, 2017

Other
This is Why We Can't Have Nice Things, a book by David Carol (2011)